Coulson Norman Mitchell  (11 December 1889 – 17 November 1978) was a Canadian soldier. Mitchell was a recipient of the Victoria Cross, the highest and most prestigious award for gallantry in the face of the enemy that can be awarded to British and Commonwealth forces.

World War I
Born in Winnipeg on December 11, 1889, Mitchell was a graduate of the University of Manitoba in civil engineering. With the outbreak of the First World War he enlisted as a private in the Canadian Expeditionary Force in 1914 and went overseas with a railway construction unit. He was commissioned in the field as a temporary lieutenant. While serving with the 1st Tunnelling Company of Canadian Engineers he was awarded the Military Cross in 1917.

Victoria Cross
Mitchell was 28 years old, and a captain in the 4th Engineer Battalion, Canadian Engineers,  2nd Canadian Division in the Canadian Expeditionary Force, when the following deed took place for which he was awarded the Victoria Cross.

For most conspicuous bravery and devotion to duty on the night of 8–9 October 1918, at Canal de L'Escaut, north-east of Cambrai.

He led a small party ahead of the first wave of infantry in order to examine the various bridges on the line of approach and, if possible, to prevent their demolition.

On reaching the canal he found the bridge already blown up. Under a heavy barrage he crossed to the next bridge, where he cut a number of "lead" wires. Then in total darkness, and unaware of the position or strength of the enemy at the bridgehead, he dashed across the main bridge over the canal. This bridge was found to be heavily charged for demolition, and whilst Capt. Mitchell, assisted by his N.C.O., was cutting the wires, the enemy attempted to rush the bridge in order to blow the charges, whereupon he at once dashed to the assistance of his sentry, who had been wounded, killed three of the enemy, captured 12, and maintained the bridgehead until reinforced.

Then under heavy fire he continued his task of cutting wires and removing charges, which he well knew might at any moment have been fired by the enemy.

It was entirely due to his valour and decisive action that this important bridge across the canal was saved from destruction.

World War II
After the war, Mitchell returned to Winnipeg to practice civil engineering. Early in World War II, he was assigned to the Royal Canadian Engineers (RCE), at Camp Borden, Ont. In 1940, he went overseas and was put in charge of replacement training. Transferred back to Canada in 1943, he was attached to National Defence Headquarters in Ottawa before joining the staff of the RCE Training Centre at Petawawa, Ont. In 1944, he took command of the Royal Canadian School of Military Engineering in Chilliwack, B.C. He later achieved the rank of lieutenant colonel.

Later life and memorials

In 1946, Mitchell moved to Montreal where he joined an engineering firm in an executive capacity. In 1965, a Montreal branch of The Royal Canadian Legion was named after him.  He died November 17, 1978 and was buried at the National Field of Honour in Pointe Claire, Quebec (Section M. Grave 3051).

The Canadian Military Engineers chose to honour Mitchell by naming the main building of the Canadian Forces School of Military Engineering at CFB Gagetown, New Brunswick after him.  His Victoria Cross is on display at the museum there.

A street in the town of Mount Royal is named after him. Mitchell Avenue, Mount Royal, Quebec.  Coulson Mitchell Lake, named after him is located approximately 100 kilometres east of Thompson. The name of the lake is being modified to Norman Mitchell Lake at the request of the family to reflect that Lieutenant-colonel  Mitchell was commonly referred to by the name "Norman".

Honours

References

Further reading
Monuments to Courage (David Harvey, 1999)
The Register of the Victoria Cross (This England, 1997)
The Sapper VCs (Gerald Napier, 1998)
VCs of the First World War - The Final Days 1918 (Gerald Gliddon, 2000)

External links

Coulson Norman Mitchell's digitized service file
Royal Engineers Museum Sappers VCs
Legion Magazine article on Coulson Mitchell

1889 births
1978 deaths
Canadian World War I recipients of the Victoria Cross
Canadian military personnel of World War I
Canadian Expeditionary Force officers
People from Winnipeg
Canadian recipients of the Military Cross
Canadian military engineers
University of Manitoba alumni
Tunnel warfare in World War I
Canadian Army personnel of World War II
Canadian Militia officers
Canadian Army officers
Royal Canadian Engineers officers